André Mandt (born 15 August 1993) is a German footballer who plays for TuS Koblenz.

References

External links

André Mandt at FuPa

1993 births
Footballers from Cologne
Living people
German footballers
Germany youth international footballers
Association football midfielders
Bayer 04 Leverkusen II players
1. FC Saarbrücken players
TSV Steinbach Haiger players
Wuppertaler SV players
SC Wiedenbrück 2000 players
FC Wegberg-Beeck players
TuS Koblenz players
3. Liga players
Regionalliga players
Oberliga (football) players